Obi Igbokwe (born January 28, 1997) is an American athlete. He competed in the mixed 4 × 400 metres relay event at the 2019 World Athletics Championships, winning the gold medal.  Earlier in the season, running for the University of Houston he ran the second leg on what is recognized as the world record in the 4 × 400 meters relay, the team running a time of 3:01.51.

References

External links

1997 births
Living people
American male sprinters
Arkansas Razorbacks men's track and field athletes
Houston Cougars men's track and field athletes
Place of birth missing (living people)
World Athletics Championships athletes for the United States
World Athletics Championships medalists
World Athletics Championships winners
World Athletics indoor record holders (relay)